The 2016–17 season was Peterborough United's 57th year in the Football League and their fourth consecutive season in the third tier, League One. Along with League One, the club participated in the FA Cup, League Cup and Football League Trophy. The season covered the period from 1 July 2016 to 30 June 2017.

Squad

Statistics

 

|-
|colspan=14|Player(s) out on loan:

|-
|colspan=14|Player(s) who returned to their parent clubs:

|-
|colspan=14|Player(s) who left the club:

|}

Goals record

Disciplinary Record

Transfers

Transfers in

Loans in

Transfers out

Loans out

Competitions

Pre-season friendlies

League One

League table

Matches

FA Cup

EFL Cup

EFL Trophy

References

Peterborough United F.C. seasons
Peterborough United